Inwangjesaekdo ("Clearing After Rain in Mt. Inwangsan" or "After Rain at Mt. Inwang") is a landscape painting by the famous Jeong Seon. It was painted during the reign of Joseon Dynasty King Yeongjo in 1751, at his birthplace in Cheongun-dong at Jongno District, modern-day Seoul.  It was designated by the South Korean government as the 216th National Treasure of Korea on August 6, 1984.  The painting is currently held and managed by the Ho-Am Art Museum in Yongin, Gyeonggi Province. Previously in possession of Lee Kun-hee, it has been donated to the National Museum of Korea following his death in 2020

See also
Korean art
National treasures of Korea
National treasures of North Korea
Geumgangjeondo
Jeong Seon

References

External links
Ho-am Art Museum
Cultural Heritage: Inwangjesaekdo
 Arts of Korea, an exhibition catalog from The Metropolitan Museum of Art Libraries (fully available online as PDF), which contains material on Inwang jesaekdo

Joseon dynasty
Korean painting
National Treasures of South Korea